Sapru is a clan of Kashmiri Pandits. The majority of them are now living in diaspora outside the Kashmir Valley. Most Saprus are Hindus while some are Muslims.

Notable people
Tej Bahadur Sapru, lawyer, political and social leader
Muhammad Iqbal a poet, philosopher and politician.
 D.K. Sapru (Daya Krishen Sapru) commonly referred as Sapru, noted character actor of Hindi film, in 1960s–1970s.
 Tej Sapru, Hindi film and television actor, son of D.K. Sapru.
 Jatin Sapru, Indian TV sports journalist, television host, broadcaster and cricket commentator.
 Priti Sapru, Indian actress known for her works in Punjabi and Hindi cinema

See also
Kashmiri Hindus

References

Kashmiri Brahmins
Kashmiri tribes
Hindu surnames
Kashmiri-language surnames
Indian surnames
Social groups of Jammu and Kashmir
Kashmiri Pandits